"Indian Outlaw" is a song written by Jumpin' Gene Simmons and John D. Loudermilk, and performed by American country music artist Tim McGraw.  It was released in January 1994 as the first single from his album Not a Moment Too Soon.  It was McGraw's breakthrough single, his first Top 40 country hit, and his fourth single overall.  It peaked at number 8 on the Billboard Hot Country Singles & Tracks charts, and number 15 on the Billboard Hot 100.

Content
The song is an up-tempo set in minor key, backed by tom-tom drums and fiddle. The narrator describes himself as a rebellious American Indian character, "Half Cherokee and Choctaw". He describes, among other things, his pursuit of a Chippewa lover.

The song contains a sample of John D. Loudermilk's song "Indian Reservation", which is sung as shouting at the end ("Cherokee people, Cherokee tribe! / So proud to live, so proud to die").

A dance remix of the single was also made. This remix appears on McGraw's 2010 album Number One Hits.
The song was considered controversial at the time, due to its stereotypical portrayal of Native Americans; as a result, some radio stations refused to play it.

Critical reception
Larry Flick of Billboard called it an "incredible single" that is "positively stuffed with lyrical and musical Native American cliches, from tomtoms to wigwams to peace pipes." He went on to say that if the song became a hit, it would "set relations back 200 years." In a review of Not a Moment Too Soon for the same publication, "Indian Outlaw" was again noted as clichéd; the authors deemed it "either one of the catchiest or one of the stupidest songs ever written."

Music video
There were two versions of the video released. One was for the original version of the song and played on CMT, and the other was for an extended dance mix. Both were directed by Sherman Halsey, who also directed most of McGraw's subsequent videos and it shows Tim McGraw performing the song at a dancehall, playing a game of billiards, and riding his motorcycle with a female friend.

Track listings
US Vinyl, 7"
A Indian Outlaw (Radio Mix) 2:59
B Don't Take The Girl	4:09

Germany CD
 Indian Outlaw (European Version) 	2:59
 Indian Outlaw (American Version) 	2:59
 Indian Outlaw (Dance Version) 	4:19

Chart performance

Peak positions

End of year charts

Certifications

Parodies
American country music parody artist Cledus T. Judd released a parody of "Indian Outlaw" titled "Indian In-Laws" on his 1995 album Cledus T. Judd (No Relation).

References

1994 singles
1994 songs
Tim McGraw songs
Songs written by John D. Loudermilk
Song recordings produced by Byron Gallimore
Song recordings produced by James Stroud
Music videos directed by Sherman Halsey
Curb Records singles
Songs about Native Americans